Pahneh Kola-ye Shomali (also Romanized as Pahneh Kolā-ye Shomālī; also known as Pahneh Kalā, Pahneh Kalā, Pahneh Kolā, and Puna Qal‘eh) is a village in Kolijan Rostaq-e Olya Rural District, Kolijan Rostaq District, Sari County, Mazandaran Province, Iran. At the 2006 census, its population was 1,203, in 291 families.

References 

Populated places in Sari County